Below are the full rosters and coaching staff of the eight teams of Atlantic League of Professional Baseball.

North Division

Lancaster Barnstormers

Southern Maryland Blue Crabs

York Revolution

Long Island Ducks

South Division

Gastonia Honey Hunters

High Point Rockers

Lexington Legends

West Virginia Power

External links
Atlantic League of Professional Baseball

Atlantic League of Professional Baseball
Independent League team rosters